Sound of Drums may refer to:

 "The Sound of Drums", an episode of the TV programme Doctor Who
 "Sound of Drums", a song on Kula Shaker's 1999 album Peasants, Pigs & Astronauts
 The Sound of Drums (album), a compilation album by the Rogue Traders